"All Good?" is the second single from De La Soul's fifth album, Art Official Intelligence: Mosaic Thump, released on August 23, 2000. It was a collaboration between the group and soul legend Chaka Khan, who sings an extended hook that leads into each verse. The song was notably popular in Europe where it received numerous remix treatments.

The song talks about people who abandoned or shunned the group after their initial commercial success and popularity took a dive, and those who attempt to hop back on the bandwagon.  The title of the song is a phrase implying that something is either okay ("all good") or not okay ("it ain't all good") as sung by Chaka, during the chorus. The music video version of this song takes place at a car wash based on the film Car Wash and features a cameo appearance from actor Frank Vincent.

Track listing
US release (CD single)
"All Good? (Original Mix)" - 5:02
Guest Appearance: Chaka Khan
"All Good? (Royal G Remix)" - 3:41
"All Good? (MJ Cole Remix)" - 5:11
"All Good? (Ugo & Sanz Chaka's Affair)" - 7:25
"All Good? (Razor & Guido Duhb Mix)" - 8:31

US release (12" single)
"All Good? (Clean)"
Guest Appearance: Chaka Khan
"All Good? (Dirty)"
Guest Appearance: Chaka Khan
"All Good? (Instrumental)"
"All Good? (Acappella)"
"Declaration (Clean)"
"Declaration (Dirty)"
"Declaration (Instrumental)"
"Declaration (Acappella)"

UK release
"All Good? (Radio Edit) - 3:59
Guest Appearance: Chaka Khan
"All Good? (Album Version) - 4:59
Guest Appearance: Chaka Khan
"All Good? (MJ Cole Remix) - 5:11
"All Good? (MJ Cole Instrumental) - 5:11

Australian release
"All Good? (Radio Edit) - 3:58
Guest Appearance: Chaka Khan
"All Good? (Royal G's Remix) - 3:42
"All Good? (Ugo And Sanz Chaka's Affair) - 7:26
"All Good? (MJ Cole Vocal Mix) - 5:12
"All Good? (Razor N' Guido Dub Mix) - 8:32
"All Good? (Ugo And Sanz Dubalicious Mix) - 6:45
"All Good? (MJ Cole Instrumental) - 5:11

Charts

References

2000 singles
De La Soul songs
Chaka Khan songs
Songs written by Chaka Khan
2000 songs
Tommy Boy Records singles
Songs written by David Jude Jolicoeur
Songs written by Vincent Mason
Songs written by Kelvin Mercer